mTower, formerly known as PSA Building, is an integrated development in Singapore, comprising a 40-storey office building and a 3-storey retail centre, Alexandra Retail Centre. It is located at Alexandra Road, Singapore. The building also houses Singapore's Ministry of Transport and the Maritime and Port Authority of Singapore.

Alexandra Retail Centre
Alexandra Retail Centre is a 3-storey retail centre, offering a wide range of amenities and F&B offerings to the working population in the vicinity. It is connected to the office premises via several links.

Notable tenants
Taipei Representative Office in Singapore, the foreign mission of the Republic of China (Taiwan), is located on the 23rd floor of mTower.
GeoWorks, Singapore's geospatial industry centre operated by Singapore Land Authority, is located on the 7th floor of mTower

References

External links
mTower

1986 establishments in Singapore
Downtown Core (Singapore)
Office buildings completed in 1986
Skyscraper office buildings in Singapore
Raffles Place
20th-century architecture in Singapore